Döbra may refer to:

Döbrabach (other name Döbra), a river of Bavaria, Germany, tributary of the Selbitz
Döbra, Namibia, a mountain and a homonymous settlement in Namibia
Döbra (Schwarzenbach am Wald), a district of the town Schwarzenbach am Wald in Bavaria, Germany

See also

Dobra (disambiguation)
Dobrá (disambiguation)